John Groves may refer to:
John Groves (British Army officer) (died 1859), Crown equerry
John Groves (cricketer) (1914–1996), cricket player and administrator
John Groves (footballer) (1933–2017), English footballer
John D. Groves, British journalist and civil servant
John Percy Groves (1850–1916), British author, librarian, and soldier
John T. Groves, American chemist
John W. Groves (1844–1921), mayor of Madison, Wisconsin

See also
John L. Grove (1921–2003), American inventor and industrialist